Lust Stained Despair is the second album by the Finnish gothic metal band Poisonblack. Provisionally titled The Music for the Junkies by Poisonblack frontman Ville Laihiala, the album was released in August 2006 after a three-year hiatus due to the search for a new singer (after the departure of Juha-Pekka Leppäluoto).

Track listing 
All songs written by Ville Laihiala, except where noted.

 "Nothing Else Remains"  – 3:55
 "Hollow Be My Name"  – 4:43
 "The Darkest Lie"  – 4:35 (Laihiala/Janne Markus)
 "Rush"  – 4:06
 "Nail"  – 4:47
 "Raivotar"  – 4:55 (Janne Kukkonen/Laihiala)
 "Soul in Flames"  – 4:23
 "Pain Becomes Me"  – 4:07
 "Never Enough"  – 4:15
 "Love Controlled Despair"  – 3:51
 "The Living Dead"  – 4:35
 "Bleeding into You"  – 3:19 (bonus track for limited edition release)

Production 
Mixed, engineered and mastered by Tue Madsen

References

External links 
Poisonblack official website

Notes 

2006 albums
Poisonblack albums
Century Media Records albums